West Coast is the debut studio album by Swedish band Studio. It was released in November 2006 by the record label Information. An expanded version of the album was released in 2007 as Yearbook 1.

Critical reception

Yearbook 1 was listed at 23 in Pitchforks Top Albums of 2007 list. West Coast was listed at number 57 on Facts Best Albums of the Decade list.

Track listing

Charts

References

2006 debut albums
Studio (band) albums